Pietro Antonio Martini (9 July 1738 – 2 April 1797) was an Italian painter and engraver, active in a late Baroque style.

Biography
He was born at Trecasali, within the duchy of Parma, a relative of the painter Biagio Martini. Pietro's father wished him to study law, but he arranged to have some training locally under Giuseppe Baldrighi in design, and then Benigno Bossi. In 1761, he won a prize at the Academy of Fine Arts of Parma. In 1769, with the patronage of the minister of the Duchy du Tillot and perhaps under the encouragement of the court architect Petitot, Pietro went to Paris to learn engraving working with Jacques-Philippe Le Bas. With the dismissal of du Tillot in 1771, his subsidy stopped, but he demurred in returning to Parma to settle, since he was no longer assured a post as professor of engraving in the Parmesan Academy of Fin Arts. He set forth on traveling through Italy, then up to Netherlands, and finally London. In 1787, he had a prominent exhibition of his prints. In 1792, he was awarded the position of Academic Professor of the Parmesan Academy, but continued to travel, until the French Revolution prompted him to return to Parma.

One of the subjects of his etchings was views of late 18th-century art exhibitions themselves. For example, one etching depicts the 1785 Salon exhibition at the Louvre; another engraving depicts a View of the Salon of 1785; and a third, the Exhibition of the Royal Academy in 1787. These engravings are historically instructive in demonstrating the crowded stacked displays of artworks utilized in this period. Other etchings indicated that the admiring crowds may have been a stock image for use in other similar engravings.

Among his etchings are the following:
Plates after Teniers and other Flemish artists
Heliodorus driven from the Temple, after Francesco Solimena
Christ driving the Money-changors from the Temple, after Solimena 
Architectural Ruins, after Robert
Pleasures of Summer, after Horace Vernet
View of Spoletto, after Vernet
View of Porto Ercole, after Vernet
View of Avignon, after Vernet
The Augurs, after Salvatore Rosa; etched by Martini, finished by le Bas.
Il Contento, after Adam Elsheimer

References

1787 births
1852 deaths
18th-century Italian painters
Italian male painters
Artists from Parma
19th-century Italian male artists
18th-century Italian male artists